Igor Sijsling is the defending champion, having won the event in 2012, but decided not to participate this year.

Vasek Pospisil won the title after defeating Daniel Evans 6–0, 1–6, 7–5 in the final.

Seeds

Main draw

Semifinals and final

Top half

Bottom half

References 
 Main Draw
 Qualifying Draw

Odlum Brown Vancouver Open
Vancouver Open